List of Guggenheim Fellowships awarded in 1996

See also
 Guggenheim Fellowship

References

1996
1996 awards